Elizabeth Jean Barker, Baroness Barker (born 31 January 1961) is a Liberal Democrat member of the House of Lords.

Barker was educated at Dalziel High School, a secondary school in Motherwell, Scotland. She studied at the University of Southampton.

Barker worked for Age Concern between 1983 and 2007. She was created a life peer as Baroness Barker, of Anagach in Highland, on 31 July 1999 and is a Liberal Democrat spokesperson on the Voluntary Sector and Social Enterprise.

Barker revealed in a speech to the House of Lords that she was in a same-sex relationship during the passage of the Marriage (Same Sex Couples) Act 2013. She has since become Patron of Opening Doors London, a charity providing support for older LGBT people, and an Ambassador for the Albert Kennedy Trust.

References

External links

Baroness Barker profile at the site of Liberal Democrats

1961 births
Living people
Life peeresses created by Elizabeth II
English LGBT politicians
English LGBT rights activists
English women in politics
Liberal Democrats (UK) life peers
People educated at Dalziel High School
Alumni of the University of Southampton
LGBT life peers
Lesbian politicians